Hany Moussa (born 19 June 1966) is an Egyptian basketball player. He competed in the men's tournament at the 1988 Summer Olympics.

References

External links
 

1966 births
Living people
Egyptian men's basketball players
Olympic basketball players of Egypt
Basketball players at the 1988 Summer Olympics
Sportspeople from Cairo
1994 FIBA World Championship players